This page is a timeline of global health, including major conferences, interventions, cures, and crises.

Big picture

Late 1700s–1930s (pre-WWII era)

During this pre-WWII era, there are three big trends that operate separately, but sometimes affect each other in development and outcomes.

First, a trend of urbanization (fueled by the Industrial Revolution) as well as greater global trade and migration leads to new challenges, including those in urban sanitation and infectious diseases/pandemics. Six global cholera pandemics happen in this period because of increased commerce and migration.

Second, there is a lot of development on the underlying theory of disease, advancements in vaccine and antibiotic development, and a variety of experimental large-scale eradication and control programs. One big example: the germ theory of diseases begins to become accepted and popularized starting around 1850. Another big example is the development of the smallpox vaccine by Edward Jenner in 1796. Systematic eradication and control efforts include the Rockefeller Sanitary Commission and efforts to eradicate smallpox. Antitoxins and vaccines for numerous diseases including cholera and tuberculosis are developed during this period, building on a trend of greater understanding of and control over microorganisms.

A third theme during this era is the formation of various preliminary international alliances and conferences, including the International Sanitary Conferences, Pan American Health Organization, Office International d'Hygiène Publique, and the League of Nations Health Committee. This is closely intertwined with the other two trends. For instance, the cholera pandemics mentioned above, as well as the growing scientific understanding of the germ theory of disease, are both key impetuses for the International Sanitary Conferences.

1940s–early 1960s (post-WWII era)
Following the end of World War II, the first batch of big organizations, both international and national (with international cooperation), including the United Nations and World Health Organization (WHO), form. Beginning with the United Nations Relief and Rehabilitation Administration for relief of victims of war in 1943, there is a big push to begin creating large scale health initiatives, non-governmental organizations, and worldwide global health programs by the United Nations to improve quality of life around the world. UNICEF, the World Health Organization, as well as the UNRRA are all part of United Nations efforts to benefit global health beginning with developing countries. These various programs aim to aid in economic endeavors by providing loans, direct disease prevention programs, health education, etc.

Late 1960s–1970s

After wrapping up complications caused by the end of the war, there is international energy put into eradication, beginning with the complete smallpox eradication in 1979. There is greater dissatisfaction with WHO for its focus on disease/infection control at the expense of trying to improve general living conditions, as well as disappointment at its low budget and staffing. This atmosphere spurs other organizations to provide their own forms of aid. The Alma Ata Declaration and selective primary healthcare are created to express urgent action by all governments and citizens to protect and promote the health of all people equally. More organizations form following these new active attitudes toward global health, including the International Agency for Research on Cancer and the Doctors Without Borders organization. Publications like the WHO Model List of Essential Medicines highlight basic medicines required by most adults and children to survive, and set priorities for healthcare fund allocation in developing countries. Generally, there is more buy-in for the idea that direct, targeted efforts to address healthcare could be worthwhile and benefit many countries.

1980s–2000

Certain specific efforts increase in efficiency and productivity, including improvement in maternal and child health and a focus on HIV/AIDS, tuberculosis, and malaria (the 'Big Three') in developing countries. During this time period, the child survival revolution (CSR), which helps reduce child mortality in the developing world, and GOBI-FFF are both advocated by James P. Grant. The World Summit for Children also takes place, becoming one of the largest ever gathering of heads of states and government to commit a set of goals to improve the well-being of children. Finally, HIV/AIDS becomes the focus of many governmental and non-governmental organizations, leading to the formation of the Global Programme on AIDS (GPA) by efforts of the World Health Organization. However, these health organizations also make significant advancements to tuberculosis treatments, including the DOTS strategy and the formation of the Stop TB Partnership.

2000s and beyond

UN's Millennium Development Goals establishes health care as an important goal (not just combating infectious diseases). Later in 2015, the Sustainable Development Goals build on the MDGs to outline the objectives that will transform our world by ending poverty, helping the environment, and improving health and education. More specific disease-targeting organizations are created primarily to fund healthcare plans in developing countries, including the  President's Emergency Plan for AIDS Relief and The Global Fund to Fight AIDS, Tuberculosis and Malaria. These organizations (especially the WHO) adopt new strategies and initiatives, including the 3 by 5 Initiative to widen the access to antiretroviral treatment, the WHO Framework Convention on Tobacco Control, etc. Private large donors such as the Bill & Melinda Gates Foundation begin to play an important role in shaping the funding landscape and direction of efforts in global health.

Full timeline

Inclusion criteria 

The following events are selected for inclusion in the timeline:

 Major medical advances, such as the first vaccines or antibiotics for important diseases.
 Major disease outbreaks, particularly those that played a key role in identifying key medical facts about the nature of disease or epidemiology.
 Key programs, innovations, and strategies in delivery of treatments and healthcare supply chains.
 Government policies or healthcare systems that are the first of their kind in the world, or have global significance for some other reason.
 The forming of trans-national organizations and private foundations that either directly deal with global health, or fund and manage other organizations that do. Note that we also include some emergency medical relief organizations, because they have played an important role in identifying and combating disease outbreaks in the aftermath of natural or man-made disaster.
 Important conferences related to global health. For conferences held regularly, we only include an event for the first time the conference was held, or if there was a particularly influential conference.

We do not include:

 Incremental advances in medical science except the most important ones.
 Rollouts of policies by different governments, or changes to local healthcare structures, except those that are pioneering. To understand healthcare at the country level, you can see the timelines of healthcare by country.
 Incremental changes to existing trans-national organizations or private foundations in their global health programs, except those that have significance as pioneering new approaches to global health.

Timeline

See also

General 

 List of diseases eliminated from the United States
 Timeline of vaccines

Disease timelines 

 Timeline of HIV/AIDS
 Timeline of influenza
 Timeline of deworming
 Timeline of the 2019-20 coronavirus pandemic

Others 

 Priority-setting in global health
 Timeline of psychiatry (timeline of mental health)

References

Global health
Global health
World history